Jukun or Djugun is an Australian Aboriginal language of Western Australia. There are no longer any fluent speakers of Jukun, but some people may remember it to some degree. It is an Eastern Nyulnyulan language, closely related to  Yawuru.

Notes

References 

Nyulnyulan languages
Extinct languages of Western Australia
Languages extinct in the 1980s